Michel Mitrani (1930 - 1996) was a French film director and screenwriter. He was the founder of the Festival International de Programmes Audiovisuels in 1987. His 1974 film Les Guichets du Louvre was entered into the 24th Berlin International Film Festival.

Selected filmography
 L'Invite Clandestin (Director) (1990)
 Monsieur de Pourceaugnac (Director) (1985)
 Un Balcon En Foret (Director) (1979)
 Les Guichets du Louvre (Director/Screenwriter) (1974)
 La Nuit des Bulgares (Director/Screenwriter) (1971)
 La Cavale (Director/Screenwriter) (1971)

References

External links
 Filmography
 
 Obituary (published in French, 12 Nov. 1996)

1930 births
1996 deaths
French film directors
People from Varna, Bulgaria